The Jenin Subdistrict was  one of the subdistricts of Mandatory Palestine. It was located around the city of Jenin. After the 1948 Arab–Israeli War, the district disintegrated.

Depopulated towns and villages 

(current localities in parentheses)

 Ayn al-Mansi 
 Khirbat al-Jawfa (Ma'ale Gilboa)
 Lajjun (Megiddo)
 Al-Mazar (Gan Nir, Meytav, Perazon)
 Nuris (Nurit)
 Zir'in (Yizra'el)

Subdistricts of Mandatory Palestine